Bible Hill  may refer to:

Bible Hill, Nova Scotia
Bible Hill, Tennessee
Bible Hill Junior High School
Truro-Bible Hill, a provincial electoral district in Nova Scotia, Canada
Bible Hill, Jerusalem, a hill in Jerusalem